George Bevan is a former college American football player for the LSU Tigers football team. He played as a linebacker from 1967 to 1969, although he missed the majority of his first two seasons after rupturing an Achilles tendon in the 1967 season opener. As a senior in 1969, he was named a first-team All-American by the American Football Coaches Association and Football Writers Association of America. He was a second-team selection by the Associated Press, Central Press, and Newspaper Enterprise Association. The Associated Press and United Press International each named Bevan a first-team All-Southeastern Conference linebacker.

Bevan was selected in the seventeenth round of the 1970 NFL Draft by the Buffalo Bills, but he did not play professionally.

References

Living people
Year of birth missing (living people)
LSU Tigers football players
American football linebackers